The Sedenak railway station was a Malaysian train station located at and named after the town of Sedenak, Johor, opened in the 19th century and was closed in 2009. The station was demolished due to the construction of the future Gemas–Johor Bahru double tracking project.

Buildings and structures demolished in 2009
Railway stations closed in 2009